Eliya VIII ( / Elīyā, d. 18 June 1660) was Patriarch of the Church of the East from 1617 to 1660, with residence in Rabban Hormizd Monastery, near Alqosh, in modern Iraq. On several occasions (1619, 1629, 1638, 1653) he was approached by representatives of the Catholic Church, but those contacts didn't led to any agreement. In older historiography, he was designated as Eliya VIII, but later renumbered as Eliya "IX" by some authors. After the resolution of several chronological questions, he was designated again as Eliya VIII, and that numeration is accepted in recent scholarly works.

See also
 Patriarch of the Church of the East
 List of Patriarchs of the Church of the East
 Assyrian Church of the East

Notes

References

External links 

Patriarchs of the Church of the East
17th-century bishops of the Church of the East
1660 deaths
Year of birth missing
17th-century archbishops
Bishops in the Ottoman Empire
17th-century people from the Ottoman Empire
Assyrians from the Ottoman Empire